Nowruz is the celebration of the Persian new year.

Nowruz or Navruz may also refer to:

Holidays
Baháʼí Naw-Rúz, the celebration of the Baháʼí New Year
Nevruz in Albania
Newroz as celebrated by Kurds
Novruz in Azerbaijan
Nowruz in Afghanistan

Places
Navroʻz, an urban-type settlement in Uzbekistan
Nowruz-e Ali, a village in Khuzestan Province, Iran

Other uses
Nowruz (name)
Nowruz (oil field), an oil field in the Persian Gulf
Nowruz (magazine)
Nowruz SC, an Iraqi football team based in Sulaymaniyah
Nawroz University, a university in Duhok, Iraq

See also
Deh-e Nowruz (disambiguation)
Naoroji (disambiguation)
Navrozashvili, Georgian surname derived from the word Nowruz
Nowruzabad (disambiguation)